Get Sharp is the debut album by electropop group The Limousines. It was released on July 27, 2010, through iTunes and Hot Topic on indie label Orchard City Books and Noise. The album features the songs "Very Busy People" and "Internet Killed the Video Star", the latter being an allusion to the Buggles hit "Video Killed the Radio Star." This version of "Internet Killed the Video Star" is not to be confused with the parody of the same song with the same title written in 2000 by eStudio Creative, Inc.

Track listing

2011 re-issue

References

2010 debut albums
The Limousines albums